Jazzmobile, Inc. is based in New York City, and was founded in 1964 by Daphne Arnstein, an arts patron and founder of the Harlem Cultural Council and Dr. William "Billy" Taylor. It is a multifaceted, outreach organization committed to bringing "America's Classical Music"—Jazz—to the largest possible audience by producing concerts, festivals and special events worldwide. The Jazzmobile educational efforts are now being enhanced by the creation of a not-for-profit music publishing company and not-for-profit recording company.

History
Since 1964, Jazzmobile has been presenting Free Outdoor Summer Mobile Concerts, bringing jazz musicians to the five boroughs of New York City, Washington D.C., Maryland, Virginia, Essex County, New Jersey, Westchester County, and several cities in upstate New York. Concerts are funded by the New York State Council on the Arts, the New York City Department of Cultural Affairs, and corporate sponsors such as Anheuser-Busch, ASCAP Foundation, Louis Armstrong Educational Foundation and Billy Taylor Foundation. Jazzmobile presents, as part of its outdoor concert series, 5 to 10 Afro-Latin/Jazz bands on the Jazzmobile's mobile band stage, annually. Jazzmobile is not a membership organization. Using a multi-arts approach (music, dance, drama, poetry, visual and media arts), Jazzmobile's program is designed to teach and encourage students to express themselves through the creative arts.

In the very beginning of Jazzmobile in the 1960s, John Coltrane, Jimmy Heath, Dizzy Gillespie, Horace Silver, Pharoah Sanders, Albert Ayler, Archie Shepp, Sun Ra, Cecil Taylor, and other black players, played in the neighborhood festivals. Past students includes Warren Benbow (drums); Roy Campbell, Jr. (trumpet); Suezenne Fordham (piano); Najee (saxophone); T. K. Blue (saxophone); just to name a few.

In 1990, Jazzmobile's Tribute Concert for founder Dr. Billy Taylor, part of the JVC Jazz Festival, that featured Nancy Wilson, Ahmad Jamal Trio and Terence Blanchard Quintet. Jazz vocalist Lynette Washington in 2005 was 1st Place Winner in the Jazzmobile Anheuser-Busch Jazz Vocal Competition.

Notable staff members:

 Frank Wess, the jazz flutist and tenor saxophonist has played extensively with nearly all of the Jazz greats throughout the world's best concert venues and on award (Grammy) winning recordings. He has appeared on Broadway and movie sound tracks, and has played with the Count Basie Orchestra, Dizzy Gillespie, Billy Taylor, Billy Eckstine, Nat King Cole and Ella Fitzgerald, just to name a few.
 Chris Albert (trumpet), played and recorded with the Count Basie Big Band, Lionel Hampton and his Orchestra, Blood Sweat & Tears, Thad Jones, Billy Harper and Machito.
 Charles Davis (saxophone), has recorded albums as a leader, and performed with John Coltrane, Kenny Dorham, Philly Joe Jones and Dinah Washington among many others.
 Roland Guerrero (Afro-Lation percussion), has performed with Dizzy Gillespie, Stanley Turrentine and various other Jazz artists.
 Rick Stone (guitar), was a performer and educator in the New York City area with his own recording label, "Jazzand". He performed and recorded with Kenny Barron, Barry Harris, Junior Cook, Ralph LaLama, Eric Alexander, Dennis Irwin, Billy Hart and Hal Galper at venues including Carnegie Hall's Weill Recital Hall, Blue Note and the Smithsonian Institution. Rick held a B.M. from Berklee College of Music and an M.A. from the Aaron Copland School of Music at Queens College, and received several NEA Jazz Performance Fellowships and an IAJE Award for Outstanding Service to Jazz Education.
 Ronnie Mathews (piano), a graduate from the Manhattan School of Music, has performed with Max Roach, Roy Haynes, Dexter Gordon, and Johnny Griffin. He has appeared on Broadway as the pianist for the Tony Award winning Broadway musical, "Black and Blue" and recorded on Spike Lee's movie, "Mo' Better Blues." Aside from the string of solo recordings done with various labels, he also teaches jazz piano workshops, clinics and masterclasses at Long Island University in New York City. In addition, he has published his book, Easy Piano of Thelonious Monk (1989).

See also

 The New York Foundation
 CETA Artists Project (NYC Cultural Council Foundation 1978-80)

Footnotes

External links
 Jazzmobile official website
 Billy Taylor: The Keys to Jazz Education

Philanthropic organizations based in the United States
Jazz organizations
Arts organizations established in 1964
Jazz music education
Jazz in New York City